Dorset Council is a unitary local authority in England covering most of the ceremonial county of Dorset. It was created on 1 April 2019 to administer most of the area formerly administered by Dorset County Council, which was previously subdivided into the districts of Weymouth and Portland, West Dorset, North Dorset, Purbeck, and East Dorset, as well as Christchurch, which is now part of Bournemouth, Christchurch and Poole.

History

Statutory Instruments for local government reorganisation in the ceremonial county of Dorset were made in May 2018. Under the plans, dubbed "Future Dorset", all existing councils within the county were to be abolished and replaced by two new unitary authorities. One was formed from the unitary authorities of Bournemouth and Poole which merged with the non-metropolitan district of Christchurch to create a unitary authority known as Bournemouth, Christchurch and Poole Council. The other, Dorset Council, was created from most of the area administered by Dorset County Council (apart from Christchurch) and the non-metropolitan districts of Weymouth and Portland, West Dorset, North Dorset, Purbeck and East Dorset.

Shadow authority
Statutory instruments for the creation of the new authority were made on behalf of the Secretary of State for Housing, Communities and Local Government on 25 May 2018, and a shadow authority was formed the following day.

The Shadow Dorset Council consisted of all elected councillors from Weymouth and Portland Borough Council, West Dorset District Council, North Dorset District Council, East Dorset District Council, Purbeck District Council and all councillors from Dorset County Council with the exception of the five that were elected from divisions within Christchurch.

The first meeting of the shadow authority was held on Thursday 7 June 2018 where Hilary Cox  was elected to be Chair of the shadow authority and Peter Shoreland was elected as Vice-Chair.

The Local Government Boundary Commission for England recommended that the new council should have eighty-two councillors representing a mix of single-member, two-member and three-member wards.

Elected council 

The inaugural elections for Dorset Council were held on Thursday 2 May 2019, alongside other local elections. Whilst the shadow authority had 172 seats, the new council had 82 seats, with revised ward boundaries. The Conservatives were the largest party, with 43 seats (out of 42 required for a majority), but with a reduced majority. The Liberal Democrats (29), Greens (4), Independents (4) and Labour (2) all won seats as well. The Independents subsequently sat as the Alliance for Local Living Group, and in October 2019 Rowell and Wyke Councillor left the Labour party to sit as an independent, leaving Labour with just one seat.

Spencer Flower, a Conservative was appointed the leader of the council at the first meeting of the council after its first elections in 2019. He had been the last leader of the former East Dorset District Council.

See also

2019 structural changes to local government in England

References

External links

Unitary authority councils of England
Local authorities in Dorset
council
Local education authorities in England